Euplotes petzi is a species of littoral ciliates, first found near King George Island.

References

Further reading
Jiang, Jiamei, et al. "Morphology and SSU rRNA gene-based phylogeny of two marine Euplotes species, E. orientalis spec. nov. and E. raikovi (Ciliophora, Euplotida)." European journal of protistology 46.2 (2010): 121-132.
Di Giuseppe, Graziano, et al. "Improved description of the bipolar ciliate, Euplotes petzi, and definition of its basal position in the Euplotes phylogenetic tree." European journal of protistology 50.4 (2014): 402-411.

External links

Hypotrichea
Species described in 2008